"All My Love" is a song first recorded in English by Cliff Richard and released as a single in November 1967. The song is an adaption of the Italian song "Solo Tu", written by Federico Monti Arduini and first released by Orietta Berti in April 1967. The song was adapted to English by Peter Callander.

Richard's single reached #6 on the UK singles chart and #8 in Ireland. It also reached #3 in Belgium (Flanders) and #16 (Wallonia) charts, #9 in Australia, #5 in New Zealand, #12 in the Netherlands  and #3 in South Africa.

Richard's 1965 eponymous album was retitled All My Love for a budget album re-release in 1970.

The song has been covered by Des O'Connor (1968) and Cilla Black (1997).

Charts

References

Cliff Richard songs
1967 singles
1967 songs
Columbia Records singles
Songs written by Peter Callander
Song recordings produced by Norrie Paramor